Aberdeenshire CC is the largest cricket club based in Aberdeen, Scotland. Their ground, Mannofield Park, is located in the Mannofield area of Aberdeen, and was granted One Day International (ODI) status for the first time in 2008. The club has around 800 social and playing members and the current president is Willie Donald.

History
Aberdeenshire Cricket Club has Three senior teams (Strathmore Union, Aberdeen Grade 1, Development league) and a host of junior teams (kwik cricket, U11, U13, U15 and U17).

At the 2008 Lloyds TSB Scotland SNCL awards, Aberdeenshire received the Magners Club of the Year Award in addition to the flag as Division 1 winners. Ken McCurdie also received the Groundsman of the Year, in recognition of his efforts in connection with the staging of One-Day Internationals at Mannofield for the first time.

Aberdeenshire featured in Sky Sports 'Clublife' series during the 2008 summer of England Test matches. The show saw the team coached by Ian Botham before featuring in, and eventually win, a Twenty20 tournament in Windsor.

Season of 2009 was a historic season in Aberdeenshire Cricket Club's history. The club won the SNCL Premier League and the Scottish Cup. This was the first time in 13 years since the club won a league and cup double, and the 1st time in its history since it has won the SNCL Premier League.

Internationals

1st XI players

Home ground

Mannofield Park in the Mannofield district of Aberdeen, Scotland is the regular home of the Scotland national cricket team and Aberdeenshire Cricket Club. It is also known as Citylets Mannofield for international fixtures.

The ground has also played host to 12 One Day Internationals, the first of which came in the 2008 Associates Tri-Series in Scotland when Ireland played New Zealand. The last One Day International to date came in May 2014 when Scotland lost to England.

References

External links
Official Site
History of Aberdeenshire CC

Scottish club cricket teams
1857 establishments in Scotland
Sports teams in Aberdeen